Disconnected youth is a label in United States public policy debate for NEETs, young people "Not in Education, Employment, or Training". Measure of America's March 2017 report says disconnected youth (defined as aged 16 to 24) number 4.9 million in the United States, about one in eight of the age cohort. Disconnected youth are sometimes referred to as Opportunity Youth.

Emphasis is placed upon this group because the years between the late teens and the mid-twenties are believed to be a critical period during which young people form adult identities and move toward independence. The effects of youth disconnection—limited education, social exclusion, lack of work experience, and fewer opportunities to develop mentors and valuable work connections—can have long-term consequences that snowball across the life course, eventually influencing everything from earnings and self-sufficiency to physical and mental health and marital prospects. Much discussion has been focused on how to reach these young people and connect them with broader social institutions in order to prevent these negative consequences.

Analysis has also examined the economic impact of youth disconnection. According to the Measure of America report, the average disconnected youth costs $37,450 a year in government services with varying levels of successful impact.

Definition 

The term has gained increased usage in recent years among policy advocates and social science researchers, particularly after the Great Recession. After a decade of relatively stable rates, the rolls of the disconnected surged by over 800,000 young people between 2007 and 2010. The latest data indicates that the rate of youth disconnection has fallen to 12.3 percent, a significant drop from the 2010 post-recession high of 14.7 percent, or 5.8 million young people.

A 2012 study by the Annie E. Casey Foundation found that "the data show that the populations struggling the most to enter the workforce and stay in school today are youth who are less educated, come from low-income families and belong to a racial or ethnic minority."

The United States Department of Education defines disconnected youth as those aged 14 to 24 years old, but relies on calculations done for the 16-24 group by Measure of America. Some researchers have narrowed the definition of youth disconnection to exclude those above an income and education threshold, and those parenting with a connected spouse.

The two surveys commonly used to calculate youth disconnection are the American Community Survey (ACS) and the Current Population Survey (CPS). Each survey has its advantages; the ACS surveys people in "group quarters" and has a larger sample size, which allows demographic and geographic disaggregation of data, while the CPS is an older survey, including data from 1940 on.

Youth disconnection in 25 largest US metro areas 

Below is a list of United States metropolitan areas sorted by their rates of disconnected youth, as well as youth disconnection rates by race and ethnicity in metro areas where the population of that racial or ethnic group is sufficiently large for robust estimates.

References

 Heckman, James J. "The Case for Investing in Disadvantaged Young Children", in Big Ideas: Investing in our Nation's Future. Washington, DC: First Focus, 2008. 49-58.
 Sum, Andrew, Ishwar Khatiwada, and Joseph McLaughlin. "The Consequences of Dropping out of High School: Joblessness and Jailing for High School Dropouts and the High Cost for Taxpayers." Center for Labor Market Studies Publications, October 2009. http://hdl.handle.net/2047/d20000596.
 Edin, Kathryn, and Maria Kefalas. Promises I Can Keep: Why Poor Women Put Motherhood Before Marriage. Berkeley: University of California Press, 2011.
 Edelman, Peter, Harry Holzer, and Paul Offner. Reconnecting Disadvantaged Young Men. Washington, DC: Urban Institute Press, 2006.
 Fernandes-Alcantara, Adrienne L., and Thomas Gabe. "Disconnected Youth: A Look at 16- to 24-Year- Olds Who Are Not Working or in School." Washington, DC: Congressional Research Service, 2009.
 Holzer, Harry J. "Reconnecting Young Black Men: What Policies Would Help?" The State of Black America. National Urban League, Washington, DC, 1999.
 Levitan, Mark. "Out of School, Out of Work . . . Out of Luck? New York City's Disconnected Youth." Community Service Society, New York, 2005.
 White House Council for Community Solutions. "Community Solutions for Opportunity Youth." Final Report. June 2012. http://www.serve.gov/new-images/council/pdf/12_0604whccs_finalreport.pdf.

Age and society